"Split/Whole Time" is a song by American rapper Lil Yachty. It was released on May 26, 2020, as the second single from his fourth studio album Lil Boat 3. It peaked at number seven on the Bubbling Under Hot 100 chart.

Composition 
The track is split into two parts: "Split" and "Whole Time".

Music video 
The music video for the track was released on March 26, 2020. Like the song, the video is cut into two different parts and features Yachty and his friends at a trampoline park. The video includes a guest appearance from rapper Playboi Carti.

Critical reception 
Fred Thomas of AllMusic said Yachty "shined" on the track, and called the song "bouncy".

Charts

References 

2020 singles
2020 songs
Lil Yachty songs
Songs written by Lil Yachty